José Pérez (born 17 September 1957) is a Spanish sports shooter. He competed in the men's trap event at the 1996 Summer Olympics.

References

1957 births
Living people
Spanish male sport shooters
Olympic shooters of Spain
Shooters at the 1996 Summer Olympics
Sportspeople from Madrid